Christiaen Jansz van Bieselingen (1558–1600) was a Dutch Golden Age painter.

Biography
Van Bieselingen was born at Delft.  According to Houbraken he died aged 42, having had the honor of painting the only portrait of William the Silent on his deathbed. He spent some time in Madrid at court (where his wife died) before returning to the Netherlands, where he remarried, though he died young, at Middelburg.
Houbraken claimed that Hendrik Pot copied his portrait of the dead stadtholder for the magistrates' room of the  City Hall (Delft).

According to the RKD he painted genre pieces, but few works have survived. He is registered in Delft, Spain, Middelburg, and in the year 1596, in The Hague.

References

Christiaen Jansz van Bieselingen at the Rijksmuseum

External links

1558 births
1600 deaths
Dutch Golden Age painters
Dutch male painters
Artists from Delft